Sorority Row is a 2009 American slasher film directed by Stewart Hendler and starring  Briana Evigan, Leah Pipes, Rumer Willis, and Carrie Fisher. It is a re-imagining of the 1982 slasher The House on Sorority Row by Mark Rosman. The film focuses on a group of sorority sisters who are stalked and murdered on the night of their graduation, 8 months after covering up the accidental death of a fellow sister.

Sorority Row was released theatrically in the United States on September 11, 2009, and grossed $27.2 million worldwide on a budget of $12.5 million. It received negative reviews from critics.

Plot

Megan enlists the help of her sorority sisters Cassidy, Jessica, Ellie, Claire, and Chugs to pull a prank on her boyfriend and Chugs' brother, Garrett. While having sex with him, Megan fakes her death. Garrett and the girls bring her to a lake, intending to dump her body. When Jessica mentions they need to release the air out of her lungs so that her body will not float to the surface, Garrett stabs Megan in the chest with a tire iron, resulting in her actual death. Garrett and the girls cover up the incident and dump Megan's body and the tire iron in a nearby mine shaft. Everyone swears to never mention the incident to anyone, much to Cassidy and Ellie's dismay.

Eight months later, the girls are graduating from college and Cassidy has grown apart from the rest of the group. After the ceremony, the girls all receive a text message on their cell phones with a picture of the bloody tire iron. Suspicion immediately falls on Garrett, but Chugs defends him. Maggie, Megan's younger sister, arrives to honor her sister's memory. Later, Chugs is waiting for her appointment with her therapist when a cloaked figure wielding a tire iron murders both of them.

In the sorority's shower room, Claire and Jessica discuss the night Megan was murdered. After they leave, a sorority girl named Joanna, who overheard their conversation, is murdered. At the graduation party that night, Claire's ex-boyfriend Mickey is murdered by the killer, which Ellie witnesses. Cassidy, Claire, Jessica, and Ellie regroup and all receive a text containing the video of Megan's death and a message telling them to be at the mine shaft in twenty minutes or the video will be sent to the police. The girls drive to the mine shaft and encounter Garrett, who has cut his wrists and begins threatening them. Thinking Garrett is the one stalking them, Jessica runs him over with her vehicle. They discover afterward that Garrett has been receiving the same text messages they have. Ellie suspects that Megan is the killer, believing that she did not actually die and is seeking revenge. The girls lower Cassidy down the shaft to prove that Megan is dead. Megan's body is missing and Cassidy finds a message written in blood which reads, "Theta Pi must die".

Back at the now empty sorority house, the girls receive a text from Chugs' cell phone telling them that she is dead and Claire is murdered with a flare gun. While searching the house for Jessica's boyfriend, Kyle, the girls run into Maggie and their housemother, Mrs. Crenshaw. Maggie claims that Kyle had been with her prior to Jessica's return. Jessica confesses Megan's murder, infuriating Maggie and Mrs. Crenshaw. Mrs. Crenshaw tells the girls to lock themselves in Jessica's bedroom and to call the police while she searches for the killer. Maggie leaves the room to find Megan and convince her to stop killing. After many failed attempts to shoot the killer, Mrs. Crenshaw is killed by the hooded figure. With no cell phones around, Cassidy and Jessica decide to find Mickey's body and use his. Downstairs, the killer confronts Maggie and throws a Molotov cocktail at her, setting the house on fire. Cassidy and Jessica run into Kyle, who injures Jessica.

After knocking him unconscious, Cassidy and Jessica flee to an under-renovation bathroom where they find Megan's decomposing corpse hanging in the shower. Kyle, wearing the same cloak as the killer, finds them and knocks Jessica unconscious. He is killed with an axe by Andy, Cassidy's boyfriend. Jessica regains consciousness and Cassidy realizes that Andy is the killer. Andy stabs Jessica in the mouth with a tire iron, killing her. Andy explains that he had hoped for a bright future with Cassidy, but because she was involved with Megan's death, he feared that she would be discovered, so he decided to kill everyone who knew about it. Andy reveals that Ellie was the one who confided in him about Megan's murder and will likely report it to the police, and tells Cassidy they need to kill Ellie. Cassidy plays along and tells Andy that Ellie is in the basement. Cassidy fetches Ellie from upstairs, but they are discovered and attacked by Andy. Cassidy stuns Andy but hears Maggie screaming for help, who is trapped behind the flames. As Andy attempts to kill Maggie, the floor then crumbles underneath Cassidy and she is left hanging over the burning basement.

Andy is about to finish her off when Ellie appears and shoots him with Mrs. Crenshaw's shotgun. He falls backward onto the burning floor, which collapses underneath him and he falls to his death into the flames. Maggie and Ellie save Cassidy and the three girls escape from the burning sorority house just as the campus police, fire department and other emergency personnel arrive.

Fifteen months later, the sorority house is being renovated from the fire and Maggie is now a Theta Pi sister. A man comes into view and the camera reveals scars on his wrists, implying that Garrett is still alive.

Cast

Production
Sorority Row entered pre-production in January 2008. Principal photography began on October 16 in the Pittsburgh area. Although set in Anytown, USA, producers of the film wanted to take advantage of Pennsylvania state tax credits (much like the 2009 remake of My Bloody Valentine) and the strength of local film crews. The film was mostly shot at night in Munhall, one block from the Carnegie Library of Homestead, where about 10 houses were dressed to resemble a sorority row. The graduation scene for the film's school Rosman University, a fictional east coast school (named after the writer/director of The House on Sorority Row) was shot outside of Soldiers & Sailors Memorial Hall in Pittsburgh's Oakland neighborhood. Interiors of the Theta Pi sorority were filmed on sets built in a warehouse near Crafton, Pennsylvania. Filming ended on March 26, 2009, and the film was officially completed on May 2.

Soundtrack

The film's soundtrack was released by E1 Music on August 31, 2009, and featured music by musical artists such as Shwayze, Ladytron, Lykke Li, Aimee Allen, and Camera Obscura, among others. The album received 2.5 out of 5 stars from Allmusic, stating: "Of the 15 tracks, only a few are even remotely memorable (Ladytron's "Ghosts", Camera Obscura's "Tears for Affairs", and Dragonette's "booty" anthem "I Get Around" come to mind), but there's hardly a dull moment".

Track listing
 "Tear Me Up" — Stefy Rae
 "Get U Home" (Paul Oakenfold Remix) — Shwayze
 "Ghosts" — Ladytron
 "I Get Around" — Dragonette
 "42 West Avenue" — Cashier No 9
 "Get Up" — A.D.
 "Alcoholic" — Cash Crop
 "Break It Down" — Alana D
 "I Like Dem Girls" — Sizzle C
 "This Night" — Ron Underwood
 "Say What You Want" — The DeeKompressors
 "Tears for Affairs" — Camera Obscura
 "Doin' My Thing" — King Juju
 "I'm Good, I'm Gone" (Black Kids Remix) — Lykke Li
 "Emergency" — Aimee Allen

Release
A teaser trailer premiered at the 2009 San Diego Comic-Con International along with the main cast discussing the film's premise and how it felt working with the crew. Sorority Row was released on September 9 in the UK and September 11 in the USA.

Home media
The DVD and Blu-ray were released on January 11, 2010, in the UK and later on February 23 in the US.

Reception

Critical response

On Rotten Tomatoes, the film has an approval rating of 25% based on 81 reviews, with an average rating of 4.10/10. The site's consensus reads: "Though it's slick and stylish, Sorority Row offers nothing new to the slasher genre and misses the mark both in its attempts at humor and thrills". On Metacritic, it has a score of 24 out of 100 based on reviews from 11 critics, indicating "generally unfavorable reviews".

Frank Scheck of The Hollywood Reporter wrote: "There's little to distinguish this from the rest of the entries coming down the horror film assembly line, though the presence of Carrie Fisher as a shotgun-toting housemother who taunts the killer by shouting "Come to mama!" offers some camp value." Russell Edwards of Variety called it "an average slasher picture that meanders indecisively between gore and gags".
Kim Newman of Empire wrote: "Even the gratuitous nudity can't quite save a Heathers-goes-to-college horror that's undermined by a silly plot and clunky dialogue".

Box office
The film grossed $5,059,802 during its opening weekend, placing sixth in the process. It then fell 49% during its second weekend of release, while finishing with $8,965,282 in total. Internationally, its performance was mixed compared to its domestic run. It managed fourth place in its debut in the UK, while it missed the top ten in both Australia and Mexico.

Accolades
Audrina Patridge and Rumer Willis were each nominated for 2009 Teen Choice Awards in the category Choice Movie: Actress Horror / Thriller.

References

External links

 
 
 
 
 

2009 films
2009 horror films
2000s buddy drama films
2009 independent films
2000s slasher films
2000s teen horror films
American female buddy films
Remakes of American films
American independent films
American slasher films
American teen horror films
2000s English-language films
Films about fraternities and sororities
Films about pranks
Films directed by Stewart Hendler
Films shot in Pittsburgh
Films with screenplays by Josh Stolberg
Horror film remakes
Summit Entertainment films
2000s American films